Mathisen is a Norwegian surname. As of January 2014, there are 7,669 people in Norway with this surname.

Notable people
Notable people with this surname include:
 Alexander Mathisen (born 1986), Norwegian footballer
 Anders Greif Mathisen (born 1974), Norwegian politician
 Arild Mathisen (born 1942), Norwegian footballer
 Bente Stein Mathisen (born 1956), Norwegian politician
 Hans Mathisen (born 1967), Norwegian jazz musician
 Ivar Mathisen (1920-2008), Norwegian sprint canoer
 Jesper Mathisen (born 1987), Norwegian footballer
 Jørgen Mathisen (born 1984), Norwegian jazz musician
 Leo Mathisen (1906-1969), Danish jazz musician
 Mathis Mathisen (born 1937), Norwegian teacher and author
 Nils Mathisen (born 1959), Norwegian jazz musician
 Ole Mathisen (born 1965), Norwegian jazz musician
 Oscar Mathisen (1888-1954), Norwegian speed skater
 Per Mathisen (born 1969), Norwegian jazz musician
 Svein Mathisen (1952-2011), Norwegian footballer
 Tom Mathisen (born 1952), Norwegian comedian
 Tyler Mathisen (born 1954), American journalist

References

Patronymic surnames
Surnames from given names